Lauren Shady (née Billys, born 14 May 1988) is an American-born eventer who represents Puerto Rico. She competed at the 2016 Summer Olympics in Rio de Janeiro, where she finished 44th in the individual competition. In doing so, Billys became the first Puerto Rican eventer to compete at the Olympics since 1988. She was eligible to represent Puerto Rico in the event because her grandmother is Puerto Rican.

Billys competed at her second Olympics in 2021, once again riding Castle Larchfield Purdy, but failed to complete the event.

Billys also competed at two Pan American Games (in 2011 and 2015). Her best result came in 2015, when she achieved 18th place.

International championships results

References

External links
 
 
 Lauren Billys personal website

Living people
1988 births
American female equestrians
Puerto Rican female equestrians
Equestrians at the 2016 Summer Olympics
Equestrians at the 2011 Pan American Games
Equestrians at the 2015 Pan American Games
Olympic equestrians of Puerto Rico
Pan American Games competitors for Puerto Rico
American female winemakers
Equestrians at the 2020 Summer Olympics